New Image Art is an art gallery in West Hollywood, California. It was founded and is directed by Marsea Goldberg, started in 1994.

The gallery shows work by established and emerging artists. It has shown work by Shepard Fairey, Barry McGee, Ed Templeton, Tauba Auerbach, Chris Johanson, Rich Jacobs, Neck Face, Cleon Peterson, Jeff Soto, Megan Whitmarsh, Faile, Tauba Auerbach, Judith Supine, Manuel Lopez, Retna, Erik Snedsbøl, Swoon, The Date Farmers, and Bäst, Patrick Martinez, Carlos Ramierez among others.

References

External links 
 

Art museums and galleries in Los Angeles
Contemporary art galleries in the United States
West Hollywood, California
Art galleries established in 1994
1994 establishments in California